The coat of arms of the German state of Saxony-Anhalt represents its historical origins. The land area was formed out of the former Prussian Province of Saxony and the German Free State of Anhalt. The upper part of the coat of arms represents the Province of Saxony with its green crancelin while the lower half shows the bear of the Free State of Anhalt.

History

Blazon
Party per fess, the first barry of ten or and sable, a crown of rue throughout bendways vert, the second argent, a gated wall gules masoned sable, on the top thereof a bear passant of the last, and over all a sinister canton argent charged with an eagle displayed sable armed or langued gules.

References

See also
Coat of arms of Prussia
Coat of arms of Germany
Origin of the coats of arms of German federal states.

 
Saxony-Anhalt
Culture of Saxony-Anhalt
Saxony-Anhalt
Saxony-Anhalt
Saxony-Anhalt
Saxony-Anhalt